Brachysomophis porphyreus is an eel in the family Ophichthidae (worm/snake eels). It was described by Coenraad Jacob Temminck and Hermann Schlegel in 1846. It is a marine, temperate water-dwelling eel which is known from the northwestern Pacific Ocean, including Taiwan, China, Japan, and Korea. It is known to dwell at a depth of 20 metres, and makes burrows in mud, nearly deep enough to cover itself completely. Males can reach a maximum total length of 130 centimetres.

The species epithet "porphyreus" refers to the purple colouring of living specimens.

References

Ophichthidae
Taxa named by Coenraad Jacob Temminck
Taxa named by Hermann Schlegel
Fish described in 1846